Mars Hill Crossroads may refer to:

Mars Hill Crossroads, Dooly County, Georgia
Mars Hill Crossroads, Forsyth County, Georgia